Niki Lindroth von Bahr (born February 14, 1984, Stockholm) is a Swedish director and animator based in Stockholm, Sweden.

Biography 

von  Bahr studied animation at the Royal Institute of Art. She received her master's degree in fine art in 2016. Her films Bath House (2014) and Tord & Tord (2010) have been screened in prestigious festivals such as Berlinale, Sundance and Annecy. Tord & Tord was nominated as Best Short film at Guldbaggegalan (Main Swedish film award) 2011 and won the Grand Prix of Fredrikstad Animation Festival the same year.

In 2017 von Bahr released Min Börda (The Burden), a dystopian animated musical. Her short was nominated for the Prize for Best Short Film 2017 at the Directors' Fortnight (Quinzaine des Réalisateurs) during Cannes Festival in May 2017. One month later, The Burden won the Oscars qualifying Cristal Award for the Best Animated Short at the Annecy International Animated Film Festival in France. Since the release The Burden has won over 80 awards.

Niki Lindroth von Bahr is a member of the Oscars Academy since 2020. She is also a costume designer and has been working for artists like Fever Ray and David Bowie.

Filmography

Short films
En natt i Moskva (2006), animation, 4 min
Tord and Tord (2010), animation, 11 minutes
Bath House (Simhall) (2014), animation, 15 minutes
The Burden (Min Börda), (2017), animation, 14 minutes
Something to Remember (Något att minnas), (2019), animation, 5 minutes

Feature films 

 The House (2022) - Segment: II - Then lost is truth that can't be won

References

External links

Fx Goby on the Swedish Film Institute Data Base
Niki Lindroth von Bahr at UK representative Nexus Productions

1984 births
Living people
Swedish animators
Swedish women animators
Swedish film directors
Swedish animated film directors
Swedish women film directors